Delminichthys adspersus (or spotted minnow) is a species of cyprinid fish.

It is found in Bosnia and Herzegovina and Croatia. Its natural habitats are rivers, intermittent rivers, freshwater lakes, and inland karsts.

It is threatened by habitat loss.

References

Delminichthys
Fauna of Croatia
Cyprinid fish of Europe
Fish described in 1843
Taxonomy articles created by Polbot
Endemic fauna of the Balkans
Freshwater fish of Europe
Endemic fish of the Neretva basin